The black-vented oriole (Icterus wagleri) is a species of bird in the family Icteridae. It is found in El Salvador, Guatemala, Honduras, Mexico, Nicaragua, and the United States.

Its natural habitats are subtropical or tropical dry forest, subtropical or tropical moist lowland forest, and subtropical or tropical moist montane forest.

References

Black-vented Oriole
Black-vented Oriole
Birds of El Salvador
Birds of Guatemala
Birds of Honduras
Birds of Mexico
Birds of the Sierra Madre Occidental
Birds of the Sierra Madre del Sur
Birds of the Trans-Mexican Volcanic Belt
Birds of Nicaragua
black-vented oriole
black-vented oriole
Taxonomy articles created by Polbot